Lakewood is an unincorporated census-designated place located in the town of Lakewood, Oconto County, Wisconsin, United States. Lakewood has a post office with ZIP code 54138. As of the 2010 census, its population was 323.

History
Lakewood was laid out in 1897. It was named from a lake in the woods near the town site. A post office has been in operation in Lakewood since 1897.

Images

References

Census-designated places in Oconto County, Wisconsin
Census-designated places in Wisconsin